Singing the Blues is a studio album by Frankie Laine, released in 1959 on Mercury's subsidiary Wing Records.

In 1962, this monaural album had a low-priced re-release in "electronically created" stereo.

Track listing

References 

1959 albums
Frankie Laine albums
Wing Records albums